The Bemidji State Beavers represented Bemidji State University in WCHA women's ice hockey. The Beavers attempted to qualify for the NCAA tournament for the first time in school history, but failed.

Offseason
August 8, 2011: Beavers player Montana Vichorek was one of 79 invited players that participated in the 2011 USA Women's Hockey National Festival.

Recruiting

Exhibition

Regular season
November 25–26: Erika Wheelhouse logged four points in a two-game conference series split with nationally ranked North Dakota. She scored one goal and notched an assist on November 25. The game was called The Wheelhouse Homecoming as it was being played in her hometown of Crookston, Minnesota. She assisted on her sister Marlee’s second period power-play goal to give the Beavers a 1-0 lead. Later in the game, she would score to tie the game at 2 apiece. Despite eventually losing by a 5-2 mark, the two power play goals for the Beavers were their 22nd and 23rd this season, which leads the NCAA. The November 26 match was contested at the Sanford Center in Bemidji and Wheelhouse assisted on two first period goals. The Beavers would hold on for a 3-2 victory. With the four point performance in the series, Wheelhouse is tied for the scoring lead among WCHA defenders with 19 points.
On January 28, 2012, Wisconsin hosted a record crowd of 12,402 attended the Kohl Center as the Badgers swept the Bemidji State Beavers. Alex Rigby made 28 saves to obtain her sixth shutout of the campaign. Her rival between the pipes, Bemidji State netminder Zuzana Tomcikova made 32 saves.

Standings

Schedule

Conference record

Player stats

Awards and honors
Rachael Kelly, WCHA Rookie of the Week (Week of November 1, 2011)
 Montana Vichorek, Beaver Pride Female Athlete of the Week (Week of October 24, 2011)
 Montana Vichorek, WCHA Defensive Player of the Week (Week of February 22, 2012)
   Erika Wheelhouse, WCHA Defensive Player of the Week (Week of October 11, 2011) 
  Zuzana Tomcikova, WCHA Defensive Player of the Week (Week of October 4, 2011) 
Zuzana Tomcikova, 2011-12 CCM Hockey Women’s Division I All-American: Second Team

References

Bemidji State Beavers women's ice hockey seasons
Bemidji State Beavers